Lil' O (born Ore Magnus Lawson; November 22, 1977 in Lagos, Nigeria) is a Nigerian-American rapper, raised in Southwest Houston, Texas. He is an original member of DJ Screw's Screwed Up Click. He was also known as O or Da Fat Rat Wit Da Cheeze. His name references his height, at 5 feet tall.

Early life
His father was a doctor and Lil' O and his four brothers and one sister had a middle class upbringing. His mother died from ovarian cancer when Lil' O was 13 and suddenly his father's strict Nigerian upbringing began to chase him to rebellion.

Soon after his mother's death, Lil' O began hanging in the streets with friends who were in the drug game, and he became addicted to the fast money that drug dealing brought in. "I got street fame, women, and a lot of money quickly and easily", he says. Eventually he got collared. After his arrest, his father kicked him out of the house and Lil' O fell deeper into the lure of the drug game. While out on bond, he continued to sell drugs and was caught again. This time he attempted to swallow the evidence before the police could arrest him. He swallowed an ounce-and-a-half of crack cocaine and his lungs collapsed. He was put on life support and his father was told to prepare for his death. "It's really a miracle that I woke up at all", says Lil' O. "I was breathing through tubes on my deathbed and I looked down and saw that my ankles were cuffed to the bed. I realized, if I recovered I was going to jail, and if I didn't I was going to die".

He went to Xavier University of Louisiana in New Orleans, where he studied business. Away from the drugs and the street life of Southwest Houston, Lil' O also began to dabble in one of his first loves – hip hop. "Man, when I was growing up, LL Cool J came out with 'Radio' and that was it, I was hooked. I never thought about rapping as a career because I was making so much selling drugs, plus the money came faster than it does in the rap game", says O. While at Xavier, in 1997, he recorded "Can't Stop" – featuring vocal contributions from the ladies that would go on to earn renown as Destiny's Child. The track soon became Lil' O's debut single and went on to score an instant local hit. Regardless, Lil' O eventually found himself out of school and back in Texas, again exposed to the same lifestyle he'd tried to leave behind. In 1999, he then signed with the Houston-based indie label Game Face Entertainment, but also began selling drugs again. His debut album, Blood Money, sold 20,000 copies but he was unable to promote it due to spending time in jail.

After being released from prison, Lil' O left the drug game behind for good and focused on his music completely. "Some days I wouldn't feel like going to class, and then I would look across the street at the county jail and remember how I felt when I was in there. That would be all the motivation I would need to get myself to class", says Lil' O with a hearty laugh.

In 2001, his album Da Fat Rat wit da Cheeze sold over 75,000. He collaborated with Big Hawk on the hit single "Back Back", that led him back to a nationwide deal with Atlantic Records, which he left in 2003.

Discography

Albums
1999: Blood Money
2001: Da Fat Rat wit da Cheeze
2003: Food On Tha Table
2007: Greatest Hits
2011: Grind Hard, Pray Harder
2021: The Greatest Of All Players

Mixtapes
2004: Neva Lay Down Vol. 1
2005: Jealous Got Me Strapped (Neva Lay Down Vol. 2)
2006: My Struggle My Hustle
2006: South Side Tippin
2008: Tha Flood (Neva Lay Down Vol. 3)
2010: Tha Flood 1.5
2016: The Re-Up

Singles

See also
Houston hip hop
Screwed Up Click

References

External links
Lil' O discography at Discogs

Living people
1977 births
Rappers from Houston
African-American male rappers
Screwed Up Click members
Underground rappers
Nigerian emigrants to the United States
University of Houston–Downtown alumni
Atlantic Records artists
Songwriters from Texas
Southern hip hop musicians
Gangsta rappers
Rappers from Lagos
21st-century American rappers
21st-century American male musicians
African-American songwriters
21st-century African-American musicians
20th-century African-American people
American male songwriters